Loes may refer to:

Places
Loes Hundred, a Suffolk county division
Loes River, a river in East Timor

Given name
A Dutch feminine given name (pronounced ), a short form of Louise. People with the name include:
Loes Geurts (born 1986), Dutch footballer
Loes Gunnewijk (born 1980), Dutch racing cyclist
Loes Haverkort (born 1981), Dutch actress
Loes Luca (born 1953), Dutch actress, singer and comedian
Loes Markerink (born 1985), Dutch racing cyclist
Loes Schutte (born 1953), Dutch rower
Loes Sels (born 1985), Belgian cyclo-cross cyclist
Loes Ypma (born 1980), Dutch Labour Party politician

Surname
Billy Loes (1929–2010), American baseball pitcher
Harry Dixon Loes (1892–1965), American hymn writer
Jack Loes (1910–1982), Australian rules footballer
Vanessa Lóes (born 1971), Brazilian actress

See also
Loes., botanical abbreviation for Ludwig Loesener

Dutch feminine given names